Eliza Grew Jones (March 30, 1803 – March 28, 1838) was an American missionary and lexicographer. She created a romanized script for writing the Siamese language, and created the first Siamese-English dictionary.

Biography

Eliza Coltman Grew was born on March 30, 1803. Her father, Rev. Henry Grew, was a native of Providence, Rhode Island. Presaging her future accomplishments, an early school teacher noted that she had an unusual ability in languages, learning Greek without the aid of a teacher.

She married Rev. Dr. John Taylor Jones on July 14, 1830. Her husband was ordained in Boston two weeks later under the American Baptist Missionary Union, and the couple was then assigned to work in Burma. They lived there for over two years. They were later transferred to Siam.

Her first large work was a Siamese-English dictionary that she completed in December 1833, after she had been transferred to Siam. It was not published due to the difficulty of printing with Siamese type, and thought to be lost until an untitled manuscript in the British Museum Library was identified in 2007 as an extant copy of the lost Jones dictionary. Later, she also created a romanized script for writing the Siamese language. She wrote portions of Biblical history in Siamese.

In Burma and Thailand, she gave birth to four children, two of whom died in childhood.

Jones died in Bangkok of cholera on March 28, 1838. She is buried in the Bangkok Protestant Cemetery.

References

Further reading
Dana Lee Robert, American Women in Mission: a social history of their thought and practice, Mercer University Press (1997)
Eliza G. Jones, Memoir of Mrs. Eliza G. Jones, Cornell University Library (March 21, 2007)
Sigourney, Lydia Howard. 1851. Letters to My Pupils: With Narrative and Biographical Sketches. (Her former teacher wrote of her on pp. 294–302.)

1803 births
1838 deaths
Writers from Providence, Rhode Island
American lexicographers
Creators of writing systems
Baptist missionaries in Thailand
Baptist missionaries in Myanmar
Women linguists
Women lexicographers
Deaths from cholera
Burials at the Bangkok Protestant Cemetery
19th-century American women scientists
19th-century American women writers
19th-century American writers
Baptist missionaries from the United States
Female Christian missionaries
American women non-fiction writers
American expatriates in Thailand
American expatriates in Myanmar
19th-century Baptists
Missionary linguists
19th-century lexicographers
 infectious disease deaths in Thailand